Vieu-d'Izenave (literally Vieu of Izenave) is a commune in the Ain department in eastern France.

Geography

Climate
Vieu-d'Izenave has a oceanic climate (Köppen climate classification Cfb).

Population

See also
Communes of the Ain department

References

Communes of Ain
Ain communes articles needing translation from French Wikipedia